The Beehive is the common name for the Executive Wing of New Zealand Parliament Buildings, located at the corner of Molesworth Street and Lambton Quay, Wellington. It is so-called because its shape is reminiscent of that of a traditional woven form of beehive known as a skep. It is registered as a Category I heritage building by Heritage New Zealand.

Construction began in 1969 and was completed in 1981. Since 1979, the building has housed the offices of government ministers. Thus, the name "Beehive" is closely linked with the New Zealand Government. It is often used as a metonym for the New Zealand leadership at large, with "the 9th floor" specifically referring to the office of the prime minister, which is based on that floor. Cabinet meets on the top floor.

History

In the 1960s the government proposed an extension of Parliament House, which had only been partly built in 1922. Prime Minister Keith Holyoake had wanted to complete the original plan, but the government architect persuaded him to approve a modern building which would house parliamentary offices. In 1964, Scottish architect Basil Spence provided the original conceptual design of a round building rising in steps. The detailed architectural design was undertaken by the New Zealand government architect Fergus Sheppard, and structural design of the building was undertaken by the Ministry of Works. W. M. Angus constructed the first stage, beginning in 1969the podium, underground car park and basement for a national civil defence centre. Gibson O'Connor constructed the ten floors of the remainder of the building.

Bellamy's catering facilities moved into the building in the summer of 1975–1976 and Elizabeth II, Queen of New Zealand, unveiled a plaque in the reception hall in February 1977. The Prime Minister, Robert Muldoon, formally opened the building in May 1977. The government moved into the upper floors in 1979. The annexe facing Museum Street was completed in 1981.

In the late 1990s, there was consideration of moving the Beehive behind Parliament House and finishing Parliament House according to the 1911 original plans. The plan was scuttled due to public outcry at the cost. Renovations were carried out and the interior was modernised between 1998 and 2006 to plans by Christchurch architecture firm Warren and Mahoney. In 2013 and 2014, the roof was repaired and windows replaced.

In July 2015, Heritage New Zealand declared the Beehive "of outstanding heritage significance for its central role in the governance of New Zealand". Blyss Wagstaff of Heritage New Zealand called it "one of the most recognisable buildings in the country". Heritage New Zealand assigned the highest rating for a historic place, Category I, to the building. The original application for the heritage designation was made by Lockwood Smith, a former Speaker of the House of Representatives. The tunnel to Bowen House is specifically excluded from the heritage registration.

Facts and figures

The building is ten storeys high and has four floors below ground. The entrance foyer's core is decorated with marble floors, stainless steel mesh wall panels, and a translucent glass ceiling.

It has developed a naturally weathered appearance. A tunnel runs under Bowen Street from The Beehive to parliamentary offices in Bowen House. The Beehive is extensively decorated with New Zealand art.

The Beehive's circular footprint (see rotunda) is generally considered an elegant and distinctive design feature. However it is also quite impractical, as many of its rooms are wedge-shaped, curved or asymmetrical. An extension has been built out the front to allow for a new security entrance. A new, bomb-proof mail delivery room has already been built at the rear of the building.

The Beehive has, since 1992, featured as part of the design of the New Zealand twenty-dollar note. A survey commissioned by the Reserve Bank of New Zealand found that the Beehive is "a New Zealand icon and as such is readily recognisable".

Offices and facilities

The top floor is occupied by the Cabinet room, with the prime minister's offices directly beneath on the ninth floor (and part of the eighth). The upper portion of the Beehive also contains the offices of other ministers; senior ministers are situated at proximity to the prime minister's office according to their ranking in Cabinet. The seniority of a minister is reflected in how far up the building they are. Some ministers, especially junior ministers, are instead based in Bowen House.

Other facilities within the building include function rooms and a banqueting hall on the first floor of the Beehive, which is the largest function room in the parliamentary complex. The parliamentary catering facilities of Bellamy’s include a bar known as Pickwicks or 3.2 (due to its position in the building on the third floor and second corridor), Copperfield's café, and the Member's and Member's and Guests restaurants. The building also houses, in its basement, the country's National Crisis Management Centre. The Beehive contains a theatrette, commonly used for government press conferences. Other facilities include a gym and a swimming pool. The building is also used by members of Parliament who hold meetings or are discussing bills or new laws.

Public access
The New Zealand Parliament has a visitor centre located on the ground floor of the Beehive. Tours were suspended in 2020 to limit the spread of COVID-19. The public gallery and select committee meetings remained open to the public, subject to review.

Photo gallery

References

Further reading

 
 

1970s architecture in New Zealand
Basil Spence buildings
Brutalist architecture in New Zealand
Beehive
Government buildings completed in 1981
Heritage New Zealand Category 1 historic places in the Wellington Region
Beehive
Beehive
Tourist attractions in Wellington City